Khady Seck (born 10 March 2000) is a Senegalese handball player for Diadji Sarr and the Senegalese national team.

She competed at the 2019 World Women's Handball Championship in Japan.

References

2000 births
Living people
Senegalese female handball players
21st-century Senegalese women